Megalopyge perseae is a moth of the Megalopygidae family. It was described by Paul Dognin in 1891. It is found in Venezuela.

References

Moths described in 1891
Megalopygidae